The 1893 Iowa Hawkeyes football team represented the University of Iowa during the 1893 college football season. The season featured a new head coach in Ben "Sport" Donnelly. Like Dalton, Donnelly was only hired before the season to prepare and assemble the team. Donnelly was disliked compared to his predecessor but it did not stop Iowa from getting their first victory in the Western Interstate University Football Association (WIUFA) with a win over Missouri.

Schedule

References

Iowa
Iowa Hawkeyes football seasons
Iowa Hawkeyes football